Ivan Lendl was the defending champion, but lost in the semifinals this year.

Stefan Edberg won the title, defeating Derrick Rostagno in the final, 6–3, 1–6, 6–2.

Seeds

Draw

Finals

Top half

Section 1

Section 2

Bottom half

Section 3

Section 4

References

 Main Draw

1991 ATP Tour
Tokyo Indoor